Gay science may refer to:

 Queer studies, the study of issues relating to sexual orientation and gender identity
 Gay Science, a 1997 book by Timothy F. Murphy
 The Gay Science, a 1882 book by Friedrich Nietzsche